Dolly Bindra is an Indian actress, known for her participation, assertive and confrontational behaviour in the reality TV series, Bigg Boss 4 in 2010.

Career
Bindra started working in Bollywood when she was 18 years old. Bindra has done roles in Hum Sab Ek Hai later in movies like Gadar, and many other stage shows. Her recently released films include Tara Rum Pum, Mummji, Dhan Dhana Dhan Goal and Krazzy 4.

Bindra was a participant in the fourth season of reality TV show Bigg Boss.

Controversy
Dolly Bindra who was once a devotee of Radhe Maa. Later she filed an FIR against her, claiming sexual abuse.
She was known for outspoken and confrontational behavior in Bigg Boss.

Selected filmography

Television

References

External links

 Filmography at Bollywood Hungama

Indian film actresses
Indian stage actresses
Indian television actresses
Living people
Indian soap opera actresses
Actresses in Hindi cinema
Actresses in Punjabi cinema
Punjabi women
Actresses from Mumbai
20th-century Indian actresses
Bigg Boss (Hindi TV series) contestants
1970 births